Frank Chase may refer to:

 Frank Chase, musician and brother of Nash Chase
 Frank Chase (screenwriter) (1924–2004), character actor and screenwriter
 Frank Swift Chase (1886–1958), American Post-Impressionist landscape painter